Guthfrith (one of many derived spellings of the Old Norse personal name Guðrøðr, also Anglicised as Godred) may refer to:

 Gudfred (r. 804–810), Danish king, son of King Sigfred
 Guthred, king of Northumbria (ruled c. 883 – 895)
 Gofraid ua Ímair (died 934), aka Gothfrith II, King of York
 Olaf III Guthfrithson (died 941), King of Dublin
 Gofraid mac Sitriuc (died 951), King of Dublin